Soegao 35 is a Mi'kmaq reserve located in Westmorland County, New Brunswick.

It is administratively part of the Elsipogtog First Nation.

History

Notable people

See also
List of communities in New Brunswick

References

Indian reserves in New Brunswick
Communities in Westmorland County, New Brunswick
Mi'kmaq in Canada